The 2021 World Women's Curling Championship (branded as 2021 LGT World Women's Curling Championship for sponsorship reasons) was held 30 April to 9 May at the Markin MacPhail Centre at Canada Olympic Park in Calgary, Alberta.

The event was originally awarded to Schaffhausen, Switzerland. In February 2021 due to the COVID-19 pandemic, local authorities withdrew permission to host the event. On 5 March 2021, the championship was moved to Calgary. The event was held in a centralized "bubble" at Canada Olympic Park, which also hosted the men's world championship, as well as all major Curling Canada championships leading up to the Worlds. All events were held behind closed doors with no spectators.

Silvana Tirinzoni and her Swiss team defended their title, from 2019 since the 2020 Championship was cancelled, when they defeated Russian Alina Kovaleva (representative of the Russian Curling Federation) in the final, 4–2.  During the round-robin against Denmark, the Swiss champions recorded the first eight-ender in World Curling Championship history.  The United States, skipped by Tabitha Peterson won the bronze medal, defeating the defending Olympic champion Anna Hasselborg rink from Sweden 9–5 in the bronze medal game.

Summary
The World Women's Curling Championship is the first event of the qualification process for curling at the 2022 Winter Olympics in Beijing; the National Olympic Committees representing the teams who finish in the top six will qualify directly to the Olympic tournament. The remaining teams that had qualified for the 2020 or 2021 World Women's Curling Championship, and have not yet qualified for the Olympics, will compete in the Olympic Qualification Event in December 2021 for the remaining three spots. If the team representing China (who already qualified as host nation) finishes in the top six, the sixth direct qualification spot from the world championship will be held over to the Olympic Qualification Event.

During Draw 9 on Sunday, 2 May, Team Switzerland, skipped by Silvana Tirinzoni, scored a rare eight-ender (in which all eight of the team's rocks ended up scoring) in the seventh end of their game against Denmark's Madeleine Dupont. Already sitting seven, Swiss fourth Alina Pätz just needed a draw to the full twelve–foot or better for the eighth point. Denmark immediately conceded, with the final score of the match being 13–4. It was the first eight-ender scored in World Curling Championships history (men or women).

Switzerland and RCF were the top two teams after the round robin, finishing with 12–1 and 11–2 records, respectively. After the round robin, Switzerland defeated the United States 7–3, and RCF defeated Sweden 8–7 to get to the final.

The United States, skipped by Tabitha Peterson won the bronze medal, defeating the defending Olympic champion Anna Hasselborg rink from Sweden 9–5 in the bronze medal game. The Americans took control of the game after scoring five points in the seventh end. It was the first medal for the U.S. since 2006.

Silvana Tirinzoni and her Swiss team defended their title, from 2019 since the 2020 Championship was cancelled, when they defeated Russian Alina Kovaleva (representative of the Russian Curling Federation) in the final, 4–2. In the final, RCF started the game off well without hammer, forcing Switzerland to a single point in the first end, as Switzerland faced two RCF rocks on their last stone, and chose a hit and stick to score one. After blanking the second end, Kovaleva missed a draw for two in the third end, settling for one point, and tying the game. Switzerland took a 3–1 lead in the fourth end after their last thrower, Alina Pätz made a double take-out for two points. RCF then blanked the next three ends, before being forced to a single point in the eighth, with Kovaleva making a tap-up against several Swiss rocks. Switzerland then blanked the ninth end to retain last rock advantage in the 10th and final end. They did not need to throw their last however, as Switzerland won the game after Kovaleva came up short on her final shot in the 10th end, a freeze attempt on a Swiss shot rock. Tirinzoni is only the fifth skip, and first Swiss, to win back-to-back Women's Championships. Switzerland has won six of the last nine Women's Championships. The cancelling of the 2020 World Championships allowed Team Tirinzoni to win back to back World Championships, as they had lost the 2020 Swiss Women's Curling Championship to Elena Stern, thus not qualifying for Worlds that year.

Switzerland's fourth stone thrower Alina Pätz won the Frances Brodie Award for sportsmanship.

Impact of the COVID-19 pandemic

Re-location to Calgary
The event was originally scheduled to be held 20–28 March 2021 at the Curlinghalle Schaffhausen in Schaffhausen, Switzerland. On 8 February 2021 the World Curling Federation (WCF) announced that the tournament had been cancelled, as permission to host an international sporting event had been withdrawn by local health authorities due to concerns surrounding SARS-CoV-2 variants.

On 1 March 2021, it was reported that Curling Canada had made a proposal to re-locate the event to Calgary, Alberta, using the same "bubble" that has been established for the  World Men's Championship and all other major national championships this season. On 5 March, the WCF officially announced that the World Women's Championship would be re-located to Calgary, and rescheduled to 30 April—9 May 2021.

Positive tests, suspension of television coverage
Prior to the competition, two members of the German team tested positive for COVID-19. The team was barred from the first day of practice, 28 April. On 29 April, the WCF announced that the three remaining players on the German team would be allowed to continue to represent their country as a three-player team.

On 2 May, several members of the host broadcast crew of the event tested positive for COVID-19, which resulted in the postponement of the morning draw in order to allow additional testing of players and staff. None of the players were among those who tested positive, while the broadcast staff had been based out of a different hotel than players. Play resumed with the afternoon session, but all television broadcasts from the tournament were suspended through at least the morning session on 7 May. The postponed matches were rescheduled to the evening session of 7 May. Due to further positive tests among members of the host broadcasting crew, World Curling extended the suspension of broadcasting through the afternoon of 7 May, with the hope that television broadcasting would resume in time for the playoff rounds. Television coverage ultimately resumed on the morning of May 7 with Alberta Health approving a proposal which minimal staff involvement for the remaining three days of the event.

Qualification
14 curling federations qualified to participate in the 2021 World Women's Curling Championship. This was the first World Women's Championship appearance for Estonia, who was represented by skip Marie Turmann. Pursuant to a December 2020 ruling by the Court of Arbitration for Sport due to the Russian doping scandal, Russia is prohibited from competing under its flag or any national symbols at any Olympic Games or world championships through 16 December 2022, and therefore competed neutrally. The team is therefore representing the Russian Curling Federation (RCF).

World Ranking
The World Curling Federation World Ranking tracks and lists the success of all Member Associations.

Teams
The teams were as follows:

WCF ranking
Year to date World Curling Federation order of merit ranking for each team prior to the event. Rankings based on the 2019–20 season.

Round-robin standings

Round-robin results

All draw times are listed in Mountain Daylight Time (UTC−06:00).

Draw 1
Friday, 30 April, 9:00 am

Draw 2
Friday, 30 April, 2:00 pm

Draw 3
Friday, 30 April, 7:00 pm

Draw 4
Saturday, 1 May, 9:00 am

Draw 5
Saturday, 1 May, 2:00 pm

Draw 6
Saturday, 1 May, 7:00 pm

Draw 8
Sunday, 2 May, 2:30 pm

Draw 9
Sunday, 2 May, 7:30 pm

^First Eight-ender scored in World Curling Championships history.

Draw 10
Monday, 3 May, 9:00 am

Draw 11
Monday, 3 May, 2:00 pm

Draw 12
Monday, 3 May, 7:00 pm

Draw 13
Tuesday, 4 May, 9:30 am

Draw 14
Tuesday, 4 May, 2:30 pm

Draw 15
Tuesday, 4 May, 7:30 pm

Draw 16
Wednesday, 5 May, 9:00 am

Draw 17
Wednesday, 5 May, 2:00 pm

Draw 18
Wednesday, 5 May, 7:00 pm

Draw 19
Thursday, 6 May, 9:00 am

Draw 20
Thursday, 6 May, 2:00 pm

Draw 21
Thursday, 6 May, 7:00 pm

Draw 22
Friday, 7 May, 9:00 am

Draw 23
Friday, 7 May, 2:00 pm

Draw 7
Friday, 7 May, 7:00 pm – originally scheduled for Sunday, 2 May, 9:00 am.

Playoffs

Qualification Games
Saturday, 8 May, 9:00 am

Semifinal 1
Saturday, 8 May, 3:00 pm

Semifinal 2
Saturday, 8 May, 7:30 pm

Bronze medal game
Sunday, 9 May, 8:30 am

Final
Sunday, 9 May, 1:00 pm

Statistics

Top 5 player percentages
Final Round Robin Percentages

Perfect games
Minimum 10 shots thrown

Notes

References

World Women's Curling Championship
World Women's Championship
Curling competitions in Calgary
2021 in Alberta
Women's curling competitions in Canada
World Curling Championship
2021 in women's curling
World Curling Championships
Sports events postponed due to the COVID-19 pandemic